John Hance (1840 – January 8, 1919) is thought to be the first non-Native American resident of the Grand Canyon, US.  He opened the first tourist trail in the canyon in the late nineteenth century. He started giving tours of the canyon after his attempts at mining asbestos failed, largely due to the expense of removing the asbestos from the canyon.  "Captain" John Hance was said to be one of the Grand Canyon's most colorful characters, and it had been declared by one early visitor that "To see the canyon only and not to see Captain John Hance, is to miss half the show." Hance delighted in telling canyon stories to visitors, favoring the whopper of a tale over mere facts.  With a straight face, Hance told travelers how he had dug the canyon himself, piling the excavated earth down near Flagstaff (a dirt pile now known as the San Francisco Peaks).  Despite such questionable claims, Hance left a lasting legacy at the Grand Canyon, dying in 1919, the year the Grand Canyon became a National Park.  Hance was the first person buried in what would become the Grand Canyon Pioneer Cemetery.

References

External links 
 

American conservationists
American explorers
American naturalists
Wilderness
Grand Canyon
Hikers
1840 births
1919 deaths